What To Do When Someone Dies is a 2009 novel by Nicci French. It concerns a young woman whose husband dies in mysterious circumstances, and her struggle to deal with her bereavement and make sense of his death.

Adaptation

The novel was dramatised for television as a three-part series, Without You, in 2011. It was later adapted into a miniseries which now streams on both Acorn TV and PBS Passport. The series was directed by Tim Fywell, and starred Marc Warren, and Anna Friel. The first episode of the series debuted January 26, 2023.

References

Novels by Nicci French
2009 British novels
Penguin Press books